Goran Bunjevčević (17 February 1973 – 28 June 2018) was a Serbian footballer who played as a defender in Serbia, England and the Netherlands.

Playing career

Club career

Tottenham Hotspur
Bunjevčević joined Tottenham Hotspur in May 2001 from Red Star Belgrade for a reported fee of £5 million. He made his Premier League debut on 18 August against Aston Villa in a 0–0 draw. In September of the 2001-02 season Tottenham played Chelsea in the league and Bunjevčević suffered a fractured cheekbone which left him out of the squad till December.

Starting only in League Cup matches, during the 2004-05 season he scored his only goals (two) for the club (in the 6–0 away defeat of Oldham Athletic on 22 September in the competition, and a late equaliser in the 4–3 away win against Bolton Wanderers on 29 October that took the game into extra time). He was released on 26 May 2006 after five years at White Hart Lane and making a total of 58 appearances in all competitions.

ADO Den Haag
After release by Tottenham, Bunjevčević joined Dutch outfit ADO Den Haag. He played at the club for one season before retiring.

International career
Bunjevčević was a member of the FR Yugoslavia side at the UEFA Euro 2000 but he did not appear in any matches. In total, he collected sixteen caps between 1998 and 2003 for the national side.

Administrative career
At the beginning of March 2008 he was named as Red Star Belgrade's sporting director, replacing Stevan Stojanović in the position. Bunjevčević worked at the post under club president Toplica Spasojević.  On 2 September 2008 Bunjevčević left Red Star Belgrade along with club president Spasojević.

By December 2014, it had been 3 years since he became the chairman of FK Zemun.

In May 2016, Bunjevčević was elected into an executive board of the Football Association of Serbia under a new president, Slaviša Kokeza.

He became sport director of the association, managing among others the appointment of the national team coach.

Personal life
His younger brother Mirko was also a footballer.

Death
On 20 May 2018, Bunjevčević suffered an aneurysm followed by a stroke and had to undergo emergency surgery. While in hospital care, the Serbian national team at the FIFA World Cup beat Costa Rica 1-0, and the team captain and only scorer Aleksandar Kolarov dedicated the goal and the win to Bunjevčević. On 28 June 2018, Bunjevčević died at the age of 45 after over a month in a coma.

Career statistics

International

Honours
Red Star Belgrade
 First League of FR Yugoslavia: 1999–00, 2000–01
 FR Yugoslavia Cup: 1998–99, 1999–00

References

External links
 Goran Bunjevčević at reprezentacija.rs
 FootballDatabase provides Goran Bunjevčević's profile and stats

1973 births
2018 deaths
Serbs of Croatia
Sportspeople from Karlovac
Association football defenders
Serbia and Montenegro international footballers
UEFA Euro 2000 players
FK Rad players
Red Star Belgrade footballers
Tottenham Hotspur F.C. players
ADO Den Haag players
Premier League players
Eredivisie players
Expatriate footballers in England
Expatriate footballers in the Netherlands
Serbian footballers
Serbian sports executives and administrators
Serbia and Montenegro expatriate footballers
Serbia and Montenegro footballers
Serbian expatriate footballers
Serbia and Montenegro expatriate sportspeople in England
Serbian expatriate sportspeople in the Netherlands
Deaths from aneurysm